Lý Nhân is a rural district of Hà Nam province in the Red River Delta region of Vietnam. As of 2003 the district had a population of 189,180. The district covers an area of 167 km². The district capital lies at Vĩnh Trụ.

References

Districts of Hà Nam province